The Rebel is a 2016 British comedy series on Gold starring Simon Callow in the title role. The show is based on "The Rebel" cartoon strip in The Oldie magazine by Andrew Birch. It began airing in June 2016. In total, 9 episodes have aired as of May 2018.

The cast includes Anita Dobson, Bill Paterson and Amit Shah.

Plot 
The show follows 70 year old Henry Palmer, a widowed resident of Brighton who is an anarchic, anti-establishment pensioner.

Cast

Main Cast
Simon Callow as Henry Palmer, a pensioner
Bill Paterson as Charles, a former hippie
Anita Dobson as Margaret, a charity shop worker
Anna Crilly as Cath, Henry's daughter
Amit Shah as Jeremy, the husband of Cath
Vivian Oparah as Amaya (series two)

Recurring Cast
Philip Cumbus as PC Burns

Other Cast
Rob Horrocks as Posh Waiter

Background 
The Rebel is based on Andrew Birch's cartoon strip for The Oldie. Vadim Jean is the director of the series. In July 2017 it was announced that The Rebel was renewed for a second series. Bill Paterson, Anita Dobson, Anna Crilly and Amit Shah reprised their roles.

Episodes

Series 1

Series 2

References

External links
 Comedy.co.uk profile
 

2016 British television series debuts
2017 British television series endings
2010s British sitcoms
English-language television shows
Gold (British TV channel) original programming
Television series about old age
Television series about widowhood
Television shows set in Brighton